Jason Stefanik is a Canadian poet. He is most noted for his 2018 poetry collection Night Became Years, which was shortlisted for the Governor General's Award for English-language poetry at the 2018 Governor General's Awards.

Raised in the Interlake region of Manitoba, Stefanik is based in Winnipeg. He was a founding member of the city's neither/neither arts collective, and has taught creative writing workshops for inmates at the Stony Mountain Institution.

References

21st-century Canadian poets
21st-century Canadian male writers
Canadian male poets
Writers from Winnipeg
Living people
Year of birth missing (living people)